Ayla Malik (Urdu:) is a Pakistani politician and journalist who served as the Member of National Assembly from 2002 to 2007 on a reserved seat for women. She is a central member of Pakistan Tehreek-e-Insaf in Mianwali.

Family
Ayla belongs to a political family. Ayla is one of the granddaughters of Malik Amir Mohammad Khan of Kalabagh, who had been the governor of West Pakistan. She is the sister of politician Sumaira Malik. She is also the niece of former Pakistan president Sardar Farooq Ahmed Khan Leghari.

Education
The Board of Intermediate and Secondary Education (BISE), Rawalpindi, had declared her intermediate certificate ‘bogus’ on 20 July 2013 that carries the roll number of a male candidate named Imdad Hussain, who too had failed.

Politics
She joined politics in 1998 by becoming a member of Farooq Leghari-led Millat Party. She served as Deputy Secretary General of Millat Party and was an MNA from the platform of the National Alliance (Pakistan) from 2002 to 2007. Ayla Malik joined PTI in 2011 and since is the central member of Pakistan Tehreek-e-Insaf, she was on the priority list of the party for a reserved seat in the National Assembly but the party failed to win enough seats to nominate her to the parliament. PTI Chairman Imran Khan decided to field Ayla in his hometown seat in Mianwali in the by elections, after he decided to keep Rawalpindi seat, as she had been the campaign manager of the party in the district in which PTI won every single seat. On 10 May 2013  Ayla Malik were injured after unidentified persons opened firing on her convoy in Mianwali.

Disqualification
On 30 July 2013, Ayla Malik was disqualified by a two-member Election Tribunal (ET) of Lahore High Court (LHC) Rawalpindi Bench over submitting her fake intermediate degree before the Election Commission of Pakistan (CEC). During hearing the petition, the ET LHC, comprising Justice Mamoon Rasheed and Justice Ayesha A Malik, laid down its verdict declaring Ayla Malik as ineligible for contesting the bye-polls.

Media experience
Malik anchored a Current Affairs program name as Situation Room with Ayla Malik on Dunya News.

See also

Sumaira Malik

References

External links
 PTI Official Website

1970 births
Living people
Pakistan Muslim League (Q) MNAs
Pakistani MNAs 2002–2007
Women members of the National Assembly of Pakistan
People who fabricated academic degrees
Pakistan Tehreek-e-Insaf politicians
21st-century Pakistani women politicians